Earlene Fowler is an American novelist and the author of a number of mystery novels set in the fictional Californian city of San Celina. She was raised in La Puente, California.

Earlene has written 15 books in the Benni Harper series of mysteries. The sixth book, Mariner's Compass, won the Agatha Award for Best Novel in 1999. The lead character, Benni Harper, is curator of a folk art museum and quilting figures prominently in many of the storylines.  Each book in the series has been given the name of a traditional quilt block pattern. Recurring characters include Police Chief Gabe Ortiz, Benni's friend Elvia Aragon, Grandma Dove, Aunt Garnet, and cousin Emory.

San Celina is a fictionalized and slightly modified version of San Luis Obispo, California. The books include many local landmarks and recognizable places from throughout San Luis Obispo County, although many of the names have been altered slightly. The name "San Celina" is improper Spanish (improper gender agreement between the subject and article) and was meant as a joke, but is now a decision the author regrets due to the large number of letters she receives about it.

In November, 2004 Benni Harper's Quilt Album was published. Co-written with Margrit Hall, this book features quilt patterns inspired by early books in the series. The book includes photographs and new stories to fill in some missing plot details from the book series.

Earlene was a short story writer for more than ten years before her first novel was published. Writing classes at Orange Coast College in Costa Mesa, California led to the submission of her first book to a publisher. Within a week, a three-book contract was signed.

The Saddlemaker's Wife, not a part of the Benni Harper series, was nominated for the 2006 Agatha Award for Best Novel. Ms. Fowler was nominated along with authors Nancy Pickard (winner), L. C. Hayden, Julia Spencer-Fleming, and Jacqueline Winspear.

Bibliography
Benni Harper Mysteries
Fool's Puzzle (1994) 
Irish Chain (1995) 
Kansas Troubles (1996) 
Goose in the Pond (1997) 
Dove in the Window (1998) 
Mariner's Compass (1999) 
Seven Sisters (2000) 
Arkansas Traveler (2001) 
Steps to the Altar (2002) 
Sunshine and Shadow (2003) 
Broken Dishes (2004) 
Delectable Mountains (2005) 
Tumbling Blocks (2007) 
State Fair (2010) 
Spider Web (2011) 

Ruby McGavin series
The Saddlemaker's Wife (2006) 
The Road to Cardinal Valley (2011)

Other works
Love Mercy (2009) , connected with Benny Harper Mysteries

External links
 Official website

References

20th-century American novelists
21st-century American novelists
American women novelists
Agatha Award winners
1954 births
Living people
Novelists from California
Women mystery writers
20th-century American women writers
21st-century American women writers
20th-century American short story writers
American women short story writers